Jacques Beurlet (21 December 1944 – 26 September 2020) was a Belgian footballer who played as a right-back for Standard Liège and Union SG. He earned three caps for the Belgium national team in qualifying matches for the 1970 FIFA World Cup.

Life
Beurlet made 348 appearances for Standard Liège, winning the Belgian First Division in 1962–63, 1968–69, 1969–70 and 1970–71.

He died aged 75 on 26 September 2020.

Honours
Standard Liège
 Belgian First Division: 1962–63, 1968–69, 1969–70, 1970–71

References

External links
 Royal Belgian Football Association: Number of caps
 
 

1944 births
2020 deaths
People from Marche-en-Famenne
Walloon sportspeople
Footballers from Luxembourg (Belgium)
Belgian footballers
Association football fullbacks
Belgium international footballers
1970 FIFA World Cup players
Belgian Pro League players
Standard Liège players
Royale Union Saint-Gilloise players